Abe Judge Clark (1894-1973) was an Australian rugby league footballer who played in the 1920s.

Career

Clark was a foundation player in the very first year that the St. George club featured in the NSWRFL in 1921. He played predominantly in Reserve Grade during his career.
He was later on the general football club committee at St. George, and was later the official representative from the St. George DRLFC to sit on the NSWRFL Junior League. Clark also played at St. George with his younger brother Jack Clark.

Clark came from a sporting family. His elder brother Harry Clark played for the Western Suburbs (1913-1914) and South Sydney in 1916. His other brother Jack was a successful welterweight boxer at the Newtown Olympia.

War service
Clark enlisted in the AIF in 1915. He survived the War and returned to Australia in 1917.

Death
Clark died on 15 June 1973 at Kogarah, New South Wales.

References

St. George Dragons players
1894 births
1973 deaths
Australian military personnel of World War I
Australian rugby league players
Rugby league players from Sydney
Rugby league second-rows